Zeyvə (also, Zeyva) is a village and municipality in the Davachi Rayon of Azerbaijan.  It has a population of 1,252.  The municipality consists of the villages of Zeyvə and Kilvar.

References 

Populated places in Shabran District